Deva Mahenra (Ujung Pandang, April 19, 1990) is an actor, model and presenter from Indonesia.

Filmography

Films

Web-series

Television

Music video 
 Mike Mohede - "Mampu Tanpanya"
 Latasha - "Falling in Love"
 Queen Jack - "That's Enough"
 Maudy Ayunda - "Bayangkan Rasakan"
 Melly Goeslaw - "Bintang di Hati"
 Enzy Storia - "Setengah Hati"
 Raisa - "Ragu"

Advertisement 
 Indomie versi Ramadhan
 Decolgen

External links

References 

1990 births
Living people
People from Jakarta
Indonesian male film actors
Indonesian male television actors